Killafornia is First Blood's first full-length release. It was released in 2006 by Trustkill Records.

Track listing

The name First Blood is taken from the movie First Blood featuring the famous character Rambo. Short sound clips from the movie are played at intervals throughout the album.

2006 albums
First Blood (band) albums